Tomás José Guitarte Gimeno is a Spanish architect and politician serving as president and sole deputy within the Congress of Deputies for the electoral coalition Teruel Existe. He gained the position of deputy in the Spanish general election in November 2019.

Gimeno has faced harassment from right-wing and far-right supporters. This stems from his decision to vote in favour of the investiture of the PSOE and Unidas Podemos coalition. As a result, Guitarte has been provided with a security escort by the Ministry of the Interior.

Since November 2022 Guitarte has been spokesperson for the Empty Spain coalition, of which Teruel Existe is a part.

References 

1961 births
Politicians from Aragon
Living people
Members of the 14th Congress of Deputies (Spain)
Technical University of Valencia alumni
Spanish architects